Heinz Erbstößer (born 14 March 1940) is a German sprinter. He competed in the men's 100 metres at the 1968 Summer Olympics. Erbstößer became East German 100 metres champion in 1964, 1965 and 1968, and 200 metres champion in 1962, 1963, 1964, 1965 and 1966. He represented the club SC Leipzig.

References

External links
 

1940 births
Living people
People from Torgau
People from the Province of Saxony
German male sprinters
Sportspeople from Saxony
Olympic athletes of the United Team of Germany
Olympic athletes of East Germany
Athletes (track and field) at the 1964 Summer Olympics
Athletes (track and field) at the 1968 Summer Olympics
SC Leipzig athletes
20th-century German people